List table of the properties and districts — listed on the California Historical Landmarks — within San Mateo County, California. 

Note: Click the "Map of all coordinates" link to the right to view a Google map of all properties and districts with latitude and longitude coordinates in the table below.

Listings

|}

References

See also

List of California Historical Landmarks
National Register of Historic Places listings in San Mateo County, California

  

 
+Landmarks  
List of California Historical Landmarks
C01